Frances Ogamba is a Nigerian short story writer. 

In 2019, Ogamba's nonfiction piece "The Valley of Memories", exploring the way in which a woman feels a bodily connection with her deceased uncle, won the Koffi Addo Prize for Creative Nonfiction. Her short story "Ghana Boy", centring on the relationship between a young boy and his gang leader elder brother, was also shortlisted for the 2019 Writivism Short Story Prize. In 2020, her story "My Husband's Wife" was the English-language winner of the inaugural Kalahari Short Story Prize.

Ogamba lives in Port Harcourt, where she works as a content developer.

Works
 Call Her No One, Craft Literary 
 The Valley of Memories, Afreecan Reads.
 The Tribute, YNaija, 2016.
 The Grandpa Whose Head was not Correct, great weather for Media.
 A review of The Valley of Memories, Arts and Africa, 20 May 2019.
 Ghana Boy, Munyori Literary Journal, 20 May 2019.
 Hues of Perfection, Jalada, 14 December 2019.
 Tree People, Rewrite Reads, Issue 1, November 2020.
 "My Husband's Wife", 2020.
 Love for Ashes, The Dark Magazine, 1 January 2021.
 Like Large Bodies of Light, Chestnut Review, February, 2021.

 Must Read Speculative Short Fiction for February 2021 TOR.COM, 2021.
 The Unearthing Temz Review
 Water Child The Dark Magazine, 1 May 2021.
 The Urn The Dark Magazine, 1 June 2021.
 Factory Baby Yabaleft Review, 24 July 2021.
 The Hide's Effect, The Dark Magazine, 1 October 2021.
 Under the Sentinel's Watch, Lolwe, November, 2021.
 The Kings Street Barbers, Dgeku, January 2022.
 On the Brink, Midnight & Indigo, March 2022.
 For Ibiso, Cinnabar Moth.
 Master of Ceremonies, The Dark Magazine, 1 May 2022.
 Reaching for Ijenu, New Orleans Review, Spring/Summer 2022

References

External links
 In Conversation with Frances Ogamba
 Olakunle Ologunro in conversation with Frances Ogamba
 Open Country Mag Hosts Lolwe and Doek! Moderated by Frances Ogamba
 ‘Iberibe and Ogadinma: Women in Nigerian Fiction anchored by Frances Ogamba

Year of birth missing (living people)
Living people
Nigerian short story writers
Nigerian women writers
People from Port Harcourt